Michelle Eunjoo Steel ( Park, born June 21, 1955) is an American politician serving as the U.S. representative for California's 45th congressional district since 2023, previously representing the 48th congressional district from 2021 to 2023. A member of the Republican Party, she concurrently served as a member of House Minority Whip Steve Scalise's Whip Team for the 117th Congress.

Steel served as the member of the Orange County Board of Supervisors from the 2nd district from 2015 to 2021 and of the California State Board of Equalization from the 3rd district from 2007 to 2015. Steel, fellow California Republican Young Kim and Democrat Marilyn Strickland of Washington are the first Korean-American women to serve in Congress. Steel and Kim, along with David Valadao, also became the first Republican congressional candidates since 1994 to unseat incumbent House Democrats in California.

Early life and education 
Steel was born in Seoul, South Korea. Her father was born in Shanghai to Korean expatriate parents. Steel was educated in South Korea, Japan, and the United States. She holds a degree in business from Pepperdine University and an MBA from the University of Southern California. She is fluent in Korean and Japanese.

California politics
Steel has been active in Republican Party politics and served on various commissions in the George W. Bush administration.

California State Board of Equalization 
Steel was elected to the California State Board of Equalization in 2006 when Republican incumbent Claude Parrish ran unsuccessfully for state Treasurer. Throughout her tenure, she served as the country's highest-ranking Korean American officeholder, and California's highest-ranking Republican woman. She represented more than eight million people in the 3rd district, which then included all of Imperial, Orange, Riverside and San Diego Counties and parts of Los Angeles and San Bernardino Counties. In 2011, she was elected vice chair of the Board of Equalization.

Orange County Board of Supervisors

In 2014, Steel was elected to the Orange County Board of Supervisors representing the 2nd district, defeating state Assemblyman Allan Mansoor.

In March 2018, Steel was the only elected official to greet President Donald Trump when he landed at LAX on his first official visit to California as president. In 2019, Trump appointed her to the President's Advisory Commission on Asian Americans and Pacific Islanders.

Steel chaired the Orange County Board of Supervisors in 2017 and again in 2020. During the COVID-19 pandemic, she opposed mandatory face masks in Orange County. She voted against requiring face coverings for retail employees and opposed mask mandates in public schools. She questioned masks' efficacy in preventing the virus spread.

On September 15, 2020, the Orange County Board of Supervisors approved plans that could lead to increased private jet traffic at John Wayne Airport. Steel was criticized by her Democratic opponent, Harley Rouda, for taking campaign contributions from ACI Jet, the corporation that was awarded the contract.

Steel and her husband Shawn supported the 2020-21 recall initiative against California Governor Gavin Newsom and endorsed Larry Elder to replace him.

U.S. House of Representatives

Elections

2020

In 2020, Steel ran for the U.S. House of Representatives in California's 48th congressional district. She received 34.9% of the vote to advance from the primary and defeated incumbent Democrat Harley Rouda in the November 3 general election with 51.1% of the vote. Steel raised $200,000 more than Rouda.

During her campaign, Steel spoke out against COVID-19 mask mandates. Her platform included opposition to abortion, same-sex marriage, and the creation of a pathway to citizenship for undocumented immigrants. A conservative, she aligned herself with President Donald Trump.

2022

On December 23, 2021, Steel announced that she would run in California's 45th congressional district in 2022 due to redistricting. She was endorsed by Kevin McCarthy, Young Kim, Ken Calvert, Mimi Walters, Andrew Do, and the Republican Party of Orange County.

Steel defeated Democratic nominee Jay Chen in the November 8, 2022, general election.

Tenure

Along with several other Republican U.S. House freshmen, Steel is a member of the Freedom Force, an informal group styled as a Republican counterpart to the Democratic group The Squad.

Steel tested positive for COVID-19 in January 2021. She referenced her own mild symptoms from her bout with COVID to advocate for opening up schools and businesses.

Due to her COVID-19 quarantine, Steel missed voting on the certification of Joe Biden's Electoral College victory. She voted against the second impeachment of Donald Trump on January 13, 2021.

In early February 2021, Steel called for the reopening of schools in California.

On February 25, 2021, Steel voted against the Equality Act, a bill that would prohibit discrimination based on gender identity and sexual orientation by amending the Civil Rights Act of 1964 and the Fair Housing Act to explicitly include new protections.

On February 27, 2021, Steel voted against the American Rescue Plan Act of 2021, a $1.9 trillion COVID-19 relief and stimulus bill.

In March 2021, Steel introduced a bill that would block federal funding from being used to support California’s high-speed rail project, which she called a "failure."

In June 2021, Steel was one of 49 House Republicans to vote to repeal the AUMF against Iraq.

In 2021, Steel joined a majority of Republican representatives in signing onto an amicus brief to overturn Roe v. Wade.

As of December 2022, Steel had voted in line with President Joe Biden's stated position 21% of the time.

Committee assignments 
 United States House Committee on Education and Labor
 Subcommittee on Workforce Protections
 Subcommittee on Early Childhood, Elementary and Secondary Education
 United States House Committee on Transportation and Infrastructure
 Subcommittee on Aviation
 Subcommittee on Railroads, Pipelines, and Hazardous Materials

Caucus memberships
 Conservative Climate Caucus
Republican Governance Group

Political positions

Abortion

, Steel had a A+ rating from the anti-abortion Susan B. Anthony List for her voting history on bills related to abortion during the 117th Congress.

LGBT rights 
In July 2022, Steel voted against the Respect for Marriage Act, which would require the U.S. federal government to recognize the validity of same-sex marriages.

Personal life 

In 1981, Steel married Shawn Steel, who became California Republican Party chairman from 2001 to 2003 and Republican National Committeeman from California since 2008. They have two daughters and live in Seal Beach, California. Steel is a Christian.

At a 2014 Tea Party event in Newport Beach, Steel said she had withdrawn her younger daughter from the University of California, Santa Cruz, and sent her to Loyola Marymount University for a one-year "brainwash" after her daughter voiced support for same-sex marriage and President Barack Obama.

Electoral history

See also
List of Asian Americans and Pacific Islands Americans in the United States Congress
Asian American and Pacific Islands American conservatism in the United States
Asian Americans in United States politics
Women in the United States House of Representatives

References

External links

Representative Michelle Steel official U.S. House website
 Campaign website

|-

|-

|-

|-

|-

1955 births
21st-century American politicians
21st-century American women politicians
American Christians
American Protestants
American women of Korean descent in politics
California politicians of Korean descent
Candidates in the 2020 United States elections
Christians from California
Female members of the United States House of Representatives
Living people
Marshall School of Business alumni
Asian-American members of the United States House of Representatives
Orange County Supervisors
People from Seoul
People from Seal Beach, California
Pepperdine University alumni
Republican Party members of the United States House of Representatives from California
South Korean emigrants to the United States
Tea Party movement activists
Women in California politics
Asian conservatism in the United States